Hell is a surname. Notable people with the surname include:

 Anne Chrétien Louis de Hell (1783–1864), French admiral, politician and governor
 Carl Magnus von Hell (1849–1926), German chemist
 Coleman Hell (born 1989), Canadian singer, producer and songwriter
 Maximilian Hell (1720–1792), Hungarian astronomer
 Pavol Hell, Czech-born Canadian mathematician and computer scientist
 Richard Hell (Richard Meyers; born 1949), American singer, songwriter and writer
 Rudolf Hell (1901–2002), German inventor
 Stefan Hell (born 1962), Romanian-German physicist
 Thom Hell (born 1976), Norwegian singer and songwriter

Fictional characters
 Max Hell, protagonist of the 1996 film Max Hell Frog Warrior
 Sam Hell, protagonist of the 1988 film Hell Comes to Frogtown

German-language surnames
Surnames from nicknames